Yoshinori is a masculine Japanese given name.

Possible writings
Yoshinori can be written using many different combinations of kanji characters. Here are some examples: 

義徳, "justice, virtue"
義憲, "justice, constitution"
義法, "justice, method"
義教, "justice, teach"
義典, "justice, law code"
義紀, "justice, chronicle"
義礼, "justice, manners"
佳規, "skilled, measure"
佳徳, "skilled, virtue"
佳憲, "skilled, constitution"
善載, "virtuous, to carry"
吉紀, "good luck, chronicle"
吉典, "good luck, law code"
良紀, "good, chronicle"
恭徳, "respectful, virtue"

The name can also be written in hiragana よしのり or katakana ヨシノリ.

Notable people with the name
, Japanese footballer
Yoshinori Fujita (藤田 圭宣, born 1976), Japanese voice actor
, Japanese footballer
Yoshinori Kanada (金田 伊功, 1952–2009), Japanese animator
Yoshinori Kitase (北瀬 佳範, born 1966), Japanese game producer
Yoshinori Kobayashi (小林 善範, born 1953), Japanese conservative author and manga artist
, Japanese footballer and manager
Yoshinori Muto (武藤 嘉紀, born 1992), Japanese footballer
Yoshinori Oguchi (大口 善徳, born 1955), Japanese politician
Yoshinori Ohno (大野 功統, born 1935), former Japanese Minister of Defense
Yoshinori Osumi (大隅 良典, born 1945), Japanese cell biologist
, Japanese writer
, Japanese basketball player, coach and executive
Yoshinori Shirakawa (白川 義則, 1869–1932), general in the Imperial Japanese Army
Yoshinori Suematsu (末松 義規, born 1956), Japanese politician of the Democratic Party of Japan
Yoshinori Sunahara (砂原 良徳, born 1969), Japanese DJ and club programmer
Yoshinori Watanabe (渡辺 芳則, born 1941), kumicho of the Yamaguchi-gumi, Japan's largest yakuza organization
Yoshinori Ashikaga (足利 義教, 1394–1441), Ashikaga shogunate
Yoshinori Koguchi (古口 美範, born 1969), Japanese professional drifting driver
Yoshinori Maeda (前田 吉徳, 1690–1745), Japanese daimyō
Yoshinori Natsume (夏目 義徳, born 1975), Japanese manga artist
Yoshinori Okada (岡田 義徳, born 1977), Japanese actor
Yoshinori Sato (佐藤 由規, born 1989), Japanese professional baseball player
Yoshinori Taguchi (田口 禎則, born 1965), Japanese footballer
Yoshinori Tateyama (建山 義紀, born 1975), Japanese baseball player
, Japanese politician
, Korean-Japanese singer, member of South Korean band Treasure.

Japanese masculine given names